East Midlands English is a dialect, including local and social variations spoken in most parts of East Midlands England. It generally includes areas east of Watling Street (which separates it from West Midlands English), north of an isogloss separating it from variants of Southern English (e.g. Oxfordshire) and East Anglian English (e.g. Cambridgeshire), and south of another separating it from Northern English dialects (e.g. Yorkshire). This includes the counties of Derbyshire, Leicestershire, Lincolnshire, Nottinghamshire, Rutland and Northamptonshire. Dialects of northern Derbyshire, Nottinghamshire and Lincolnshire usually share similarities with Northern English dialects. Relative to other English dialects, there have been relatively few studies of East Midlands English.

Origins

The Eastern English Midlands were incorporated in the Norse-controlled Danelaw in the late 9th century by Ivar the Boneless. With their conquest, the county towns of the East Midlands counties were converted into fortified, Viking city-states, known as the Five Boroughs of the Danelaw. The region's dialect owes much of its grammar and vocabulary to the Nordic influences of its conquerors. For example, the East Midlands verb to scraight ('to cry') is thought to be derived from the Norse, skrike in modern Scandinavian, also meaning to cry.

The East Midlands dialect of Middle English which extended over a much larger area, as far south as Middlesex, is the precursor of modern English spoken today, which has descended from the early modern English of the early 16th century.

East Midlands dialects in literature
The novelist and East Midlander D. H. Lawrence was from the Nottinghamshire town of Eastwood and wrote in the Nottinghamshire and Derbyshire Coalfield dialects in several poems as well as in his more famous works such as Lady Chatterley's Lover and Sons and Lovers.

Though spoken less commonly today, the dialect of the East Midlands has been investigated in texts such as the Ey Up Mi Duck series of books (and an LP) by Richard Scollins and John Titford. These books were originally intended as a study of Derbyshire Dialect, particularly the distinctive speech of Ilkeston and the Erewash valley, but later editions acknowledge similarities in vocabulary and grammar which unite the East Midlands dialects and broadened their appeal to the region as a whole.

"Ey up" (often spelt ayup / eyup) is a greeting thought to be of Old Norse origin (se upp) used widely throughout the East Midlands, North Midlands, North Staffordshire and Yorkshire, and "m' duck" is thought to be derived from a respectful Anglo Saxon form of address, "Duka" (literally "duke"), and is unrelated to waterfowl.
 Non-natives of the East Midlands and North Staffordshire are often surprised to hear men greet each other as "m' duck".

Grammar

Those who speak traditional regional dialects are not trying unsuccessfully to speak Standard English. East Midlands English follows a series of distinct grammatical rules. Some examples follow below.

Formal address

Until the mid-20th century, it was not uncommon to hear the use of informal forms of address, thee and thou, as compared to the more formal you. Use of the informal form of address is now uncommon in modern speech.

Personal and possessive pronouns

Personal pronouns differ from standard English as follows:

Example: It eent theirn; it's ourn! (It isn't theirs; it's ours!)

Reflexive pronouns
Reflexive pronouns are characterised by the replacement of "self" with sen (from Middle English seluen)
 Y'usen – Yourself
 Mesen – Myself
 Thisens – Themselves/Yourselves
 Ussens – Ourselves
Example: We sh'll ay to do it ussens. (We shall have to do it ourselves.)

Vocabulary
Humorous texts, such as Nottingham As it is Spoke, have used their phonetically spelled words to deliberately confuse non-natives of the region.

Alrate yooth?Are you alright young man?
Avya gorra wi'ya?Is the wife with you? (lit. "Have you got her with you?) TH-fronting became a potential feature of the accents of the region in around 1960.
'Int any onya any onya?  Here is an example of Belper, Derbyshire dialect when asking a group of people if any of them have any matches with which to light a pipe. Hasn’t any of you, got any [matches] on you? 
It's looking’ a bit black ower Bill's movver'sIt looks like rain. (lit. "It's looking a bit black over Bill's Mother's.") – a common, if somewhat old-fashioned, Midlands expression implying impending bad weather. The spelling  chosen to indicate the phonological specification in the traditional dialect of : . The identity of Bill or where his mother’s house was located is open to question although is possibly derived from Kaiser Bill 
Awont gooin t’worra!I wasn't going to, was I!
A farnd im in cutI found him in the Canal, (lit. "I found him in the cut). Using the traditional and local word  for Canal. Canals were originally referred to as "Cuts" because during the industrial revolution canals or highways for transportation of goods were literally "cut" into the landscape and allowed to fill with water.
Thez summat up wi’imI think he may be ill. (lit. "There's something up with  him."). The spellings here chosen to indicate the ‘‘Northern’’ feature that  is a monophthong, the non-Standard English word , which is historically found in many dialects across England (cf. its use by the London boatmen Gaffer and Riderhood in Our Mutual Friend and by the farmhands in Far from the Madding Crowd), the weakform of  previously mentioned and H-dropping. 
Yer norrayin no tuffees!You’re not having any sweets! (should not be taken to mean ‘toffees’ alone as in East Midlands dialect’ “tuffees” can mean all types of sweets).

However, there are many words in use in the traditional East Midlands Dialect which do not appear in standard English. The short list below is by no means exhaustive. More comprehensive glossaries exist within texts such as Ey Up Mi Duck by Richard Scollins and John Titford.

aught  anything (homographic with the now literary General English )
nesha weak person, or one who feels the cold. Found in many parts of England, cf. its use in Hardy.
belt-jobeasy job (used in certain coal-mining communities based on watching a conveyor belt)
causiepavement ("causey" is an older word from which 'causeway' is derived.)
coba bread roll (bap); (as verb) to throw
cob loafbaker's term used across the UK for a hemispherical loaf
cloutstrousers (usually pronounced ); (as verb:) hits something or someone.
jitty/jettyalleyway.
twitchelalleyway. Typically (but not exclusively) alleyways providing access to the rear of terraced housing. Can also mean a path between gardens (E.g. allotments)
larup/laropto cover with (usually a thick substance)
mardy (or etymological marredy) grumpy, sulky (i.e. "She's a mardy one!")
mashto make a pot of tea (i.e. "I'll go n’mash tea.")
piggleto pick at a scab, spot or a skin irritation (i.e. "Stop piggling that scab!")
puddled/puddle-drunk intoxicated or stupid
putherto pour out uncontrollably usually of smoke, steam or dust
rammelrubbish/waste
scraight/scraitin'to cry/crying
sile rain heavily
snapin or snap lunch/food,tekken ta werk
snidered/snided/sniedcovered/infested, (DH Lawrence used the word 'Snied' in a description of an infestation of mice in Sons and Lovers.),
wazzerk/wassockfool (used across the East & West Midlands)

There are also word forms that occur in Standard English but which have additional meanings in some of the varieties considered here. 
bonny  In many dialects, this has the sense of ‘looking well’ often referring to a healthy plumpness. In Derby, Leicester and Nottingham, there still also exists a transferred sense of plump, robust, stout or overweight derived from this sense. Cf. Samuel Johnson's comment that ‘‘It seems to be used in general conversation for plump’’ as cited in NED Bonny 2 b as (J.).  
(There is a yet older sense now only commonly used in Scots, Northern & some Midland dialects meaning 'beautiful' generally rather than of individuals having a pleasing embonpoint specifically.)
fast stuck, caught (i.e. "Who's got a finger fast?")
tuffeessweets, confectionery

badlyhungover/ill
croakerdoctor
croggiean (illegal) crossbar ride, "two-up" on the crossbar of a bicycle
duck's necksbottle of lemonade
fuddle an ad hoc buffet or Potluck
oakie ice cream (common in Leicestershire) see Hokey cokey
pota plaster cast
suckericed lolly
tabsears, also called lugholes
yack to yank:In Leicester and Leicestershire to throw as in 'yack it away' or 'yack it to me'
cos can you

The greeting 'now then' (as 'Nah theen') is still in use in Lincolnshire and North-East Derbyshire, used where other people might say "Hello". 'Nen mate' can also be heard instead of "now then mate".

People from Leicester are known in the popular holiday resort Skegness as "Chisits", due to their expression for "how much is it" when asking the price of goods in shops.

Phonology
 East Midlands accents generally lack the trap–bath split, so that cast is pronounced  rather than the  pronunciation associated with most southern accents.
 East Midlands accents are generally non-rhotic, instead drawing out their vowels, resulting in the Midlands Drawl, which can to non-natives be mistaken for dry sarcasm. 
 In Lincolnshire, sounds like the u vowel of words like strut being realised as  may be even shorter than in the North.
 In Leicester, words with short vowels such as up and last have a northern pronunciation, whereas words with vowels such as down and road sound rather more like a south-eastern accent. The vowel sound at the end of words like border (and the name of the city) is also a distinctive feature.
 Lincolnshire also has a marked north–south split in terms of accent. The north shares many features with Yorkshire, such as the open a sound in "car" and "park" or the replacement of take, make, and sake’' with tek, mek, and sek. The south of Lincolnshire is close to Received Pronunciation, although it still has a short Northern a in words such as bath.
 Mixing of the words was and were when the other is used in Standard English.
 In Northamptonshire, crossed by the north–south isogloss, residents of the north of the county have an accent similar to that of Leicestershire and those in the south an accent similar to rural Oxfordshire.
 The town of Corby in northern Northamptonshire has an accent with some originally Scottish features, apparently due to immigration of Scottish steelworkers. This pronunciation is used across Scotland and most of Northern England, but Corby is alone in the Midlands in using it.

Dialect variations within the political region

Southern Northamptonshire
Northamptonshire is in the East Midlands region defined in the late 20th century, and has historically harboured its own dialect comparable to other forms of East Midlands English, particularly among the older generation. However, more recently its linguistic distinctiveness has significantly eroded due to influences from the western parts of East Anglia, the West Midlands, and the South as well as the 'Watford Gap isogloss', the demarcation line between southern and northern English accents.

The Danelaw split the present county into a Viking north and a Saxon south. This is quite plainly heard, with people in the south speaking more like people from Oxfordshire or Cambridgeshire and people in the north sounding more like people from Leicestershire.

Corbyite
Also of note is the anomalous dialect of Corbyite spoken around Corby in the north of Northamptonshire, which reflects the migration of large numbers of Scottish and Irish steelworkers to the town during the 20th century. The dialect is often compared to Glaswegian.

Derbyshire
The dialect of Coalville in Leicestershire is said to resemble that of Derbyshire because many of the Coalville miners came from there. Coalville's name is still almost exclusive pronounced as "Co-ville" by its inhabitants. Neighbouring pit villages such as Whitwick ("Whittick") share the Coalville inflection as a result of the same huge influx of Derbyshire miners.

The city of Derby, as well as boroughs in the vicinity of the city such as Amber Valley and Erewash share a common Derby dialect, which sounds largely similar to other East Midlands dialects such as Nottingham and Leicester. However, many other dialects in the county are influenced by neighbouring areas and cities. For example, the dialect of Glossop in the High Peak borough is largely similar to the North West's Manchester dialect due to its close geographical position to Greater Manchester (particularly in the Manchester Overspill estate of Gamesley), while that of Chesterfield and Bolsover share commonalities with the South Yorkshire dialect owing to their proximity to Sheffield and Doncaster. In addition, the dialect of the Derbyshire Dales is near identical to that of the bordering North Staffordshire, mimicking dialects in and around Stoke-on-Trent, as well as that of Crewe in Cheshire, North West England.

Lincolnshire and East Lincolnshire
Lincolnshire has long been an economically relatively homogeneous, less industrial more heavily agricultural county and is in part naturally separated by the River Trent divorcing its largest market town, Gainsborough, Torksey & the City of Lincoln from Nottinghamshire. East of the Lincolnshire Wolds, in the southern part of the county, the Lincolnshire dialect is closely linked to The Fens and East Anglia where East Anglian English is spoken, and, in the northern areas of the county, the local speech has characteristics in common with the speech of the East Riding of Yorkshire. This is largely due to the fact that the majority of the land area of Lincolnshire was surrounded by sea, the Humber, marshland, and the Wolds; these geographical circumstances permitted little linguistic interference from the East Midlands dialects until the nineteenth century when canal and rail routes penetrated the eastern heartland of the country.

Nottinghamshire
Minor variations still endure between Nottinghamshire and Derbyshire.

In North Nottinghamshire and North-East Derbyshire, the dialect is very similar to South Yorkshire, including the occasional use of the pronoun thou amongst older people.  See Stephen Whyles's book A Scab is no Son of Mine for examples of speech of the Worksop area.

Counties in which East Midlands English is spoken
Cambridgeshire (Limited usage around Peterborough)
Derbyshire (Limited usage in northern areas such as High Peak, Chesterfield and Bolsover)
Leicestershire
Lincolnshire (except areas within the Yorkshire and the Humber region)
Nottinghamshire (Usage less frequent in Bassetlaw)
Northamptonshire
Rutland
Staffordshire (Limited usage around Burton-upon-Trent and Uttoxeter)

In popular culture

The children's writer Helen Cresswell came from Nottingham, lived in Eakring and some of her characters featured on television during the 1970s and 1980s, such as Lizzie Dripping and Polly Flint, have distinct East Midlands accents, otherwise rarely heard in national broadcast media at the time.

British actor Jack O'Connell has a distinct Derbyshire accent.

The character ‘Sylvie’ in the Disney+ Marvel series ‘Loki', played by Sophia Di Martino, has an East Midlands accent: “Di Martino's desire to represent underserved people led her to use her natural Nottingham accent on ‘Loki’. 

Notes

References

Bibliography
Evans, Arthur Benoni (1881) Leicestershire Words, Phrases and Sayings; ed. by Sebastian Evans. London: Trübner for the English Dialect Society
Wright, Joseph (ed.) (1898–1905) The English Dialect Dictionary. 6 vols. Oxford University Press ("appendices include dialect words grouped by region")
Skeat, W. W. (ed.) (1874) "Derbyshire lead mining terms", by T. Houghton; 1681 ... "Derbyshire mining terms", by J. Mawe; 1802 [with other texts]. London: N. Trübner for the English Dialect Society
Mander, James (1824) The Derbyshire Miners' Glossary. Bakewell : Printed at the Minerva Press, for the author by G. Nall (High Peak and Wirksworth districts)
Pegge, Samuel (1896) Two Collections of Derbicisms''; ed. by W. W. Skeat & T. Hallam. London: for the English Dialect Society by H. Frowde, Oxford University Press
Braber, N. (2014). 'The concept of identity in the East Midlands'. English Today 30: 3–10.

External links
Far-welter'd: the East Lincolnshire Dialect Society
 Dialect words recorded in the Northamptonshire village of Sulgrave
 Specimens of the Coalville dialect
Conversation in Coalville about accent, dialect and attitudes to language; BBC Voices; British Library
 BBC information page on E. Midlands Dialect
 Angelina Jolie baffles Holywood with 'ay up mi duck'
 Dolly Parton says 'ay up mi duck' at book scheme launch
 Dialect Poems from the English regions

Links to East Midlands dialect in literature
The Dialect Poems of D. H. Lawrence (Nottinghamshire and Derbyshire Coalfield)
Dialect in the East Midlands – BBC East Midlands

English, British
English language in England
Languages of the United Kingdom
Culture in Derbyshire
Leicestershire
Lincolnshire
Rutland
Culture in the East Midlands
Nottinghamshire